Ian T. McNuff (born 10 March 1957 in Ealing) is a British rower who competed in the 1980 Summer Olympics.

Rowing career
In 1975, McNuff along with John Beattie, Robin Roberts and Martin Cross was a crew member of the Ealing High Schools coxless fours boat coached by their History Teacher David Tanner (later Sir David Tanner CBE) which won the silver medal at the World Junior Rowing Championships for Great Britain in Montreal behind East Germany and in front of West Germany. The following year he was part of the coxless four that finished 10th overall after a fourth-place finish in the B final at the 1977 World Rowing Championships in Amsterdam.

In 1978 along with John Beattie, David Townsend and Martin Cross he was a member of the British coxless four boat (coached by Tanner) which won the bronze medal in the 1978 World Rowing Championships at Karipiro, New Zealand behind Russia and East Germany. The following year in 1979 he was a member of the British coxless four boat (again with Beattie, Townsend and Cross and coached by Tanner) which won the bronze medal in the 1979 World Rowing Championships at Bled, Yugoslavia behind East Germany and Czechoslovakia.

In the 1980 Moscow Olympics John Beattie, David Townsend and Martin Cross he was a crew member of the British boat which won the bronze medal in the Olympic coxless fours event behind East Germany and Russia. Coached by David Tanner

Personal life
He is married to fellow GB rower Sue Handscomb.

References

 profile

1957 births
Living people
English male rowers
British male rowers
Olympic rowers of Great Britain
People educated at Ealing County Grammar School for Boys
Rowers at the 1980 Summer Olympics
Olympic bronze medallists for Great Britain
Olympic medalists in rowing
Medalists at the 1980 Summer Olympics
World Rowing Championships medalists for Great Britain